Saeed Ahmad Akhtar was an Urdu poet, playwright and educationist. He published his first Urdu poetry collection Diyaar e Shab in 1976. The book got several awards including the Abbasin Arts Council Award for the best book of the year. He published 12 Urdu poetry collections and one English poetry collection so far. He also wrote many plays and documentaries for Pakistan television and Radio Pakistan.

He was born on 3 March 1933 in  Pishin, Pakistan. He completed his masters in English Literature from Peshawar University in 1958 and then masters in Urdu Literature from the same university in 1965. After working as a lecturer and professor of English in the provincial Education Department since 1954, he joined the West Pakistan Civil Service in 1968 as Assistant Political Officer. He served in many Districts of Khyber Pakhtunkhwa as Assistant Commissioner, Deputy Commissioner and Additional Commissioner for 22 years, he retired in 1990.

He belonged to Kulachi Khyber Pukhtunkhwa and permanently settled in Dera Ismail Khan, Khyber Pakhtunkhwa. Poetry, music and educational social work have been the passion of his life. "Love for all and hatred for none" has been the moving forces of his life. He remained a member of  syndicate and selection board of the Gomal University for years. Saeed Ahmad Akhtar has participated in various symposia in Pakistan and abroad. He died on 20 August 2013.

Literary contributions

 Diyaar e Shab (Anthology of Urdu poetry)  1976
 Sath e Aab (Anthology of Urdu poetry)  1978
 Chandni Ke Saaye (Anthology of Urdu poetry)  1981
 Khwabgeenay (Anthology of Urdu poetry) 1983
 Le Gai Pawan Uraa (Anthology of Urdu poetry) 1987
 Pata Toota Daal Se (collection of the 1st five books) 1987
 Pooja Ke Phool (Anthology of Urdu poetry) 2000
 Varshanjali (Anthology of Urdu poetry) 2002
 Songs from the Desert (Anthology of English poetry) 2003
 Abb Ke Bichray Kab Milain (Anthology of Urdu poetry )2007
 Door Paray Hain Jaa (Anthology of Urdu poetry ) 2009
 Ghonghat Ka Patt Khol Ri( Anthology of Urdu poetry ) 2010
 Baichay To Bik Jaoun (Anthology of Urdu poetry ) 2011

See also
 List of Urdu Poets
 Urdu poetry

References

1933 births
2013 deaths
People from Dera Ismail Khan District
People from Pishin District
Pakistani poets
Pakistani dramatists and playwrights
Urdu-language poets from Pakistan
University of Peshawar alumni